Operation Vantage was a British military operation in 1961 to support the newly independent state of Kuwait against territorial claims by its neighbour, Iraq. The UK reacted to a call for protection from Sheikh Abdullah III Al-Salim Al-Sabah of Kuwait, and air, sea and land forces were in place within days. Iraq did not attack and the British forces were replaced by the Arab League. Iraq recognised Kuwaiti independence in 1963.

Background
In 1958, Abdul Karim Qasim seized power in Iraq. He was seen by western powers as unpredictable and Iraq as unstable. On 25 June 1961, following Britain's relinquishing authority in Kuwait, Qasim announced that Kuwait would be incorporated into Iraq and the military threat was seen, by Britain, as imminent. The reasons for Iraqi belligerence are debatable, but as well as the political gain to be accrued from a successful military campaign, Kuwait's assets at the time included possible oil reserves (confirmed later) and secure access to the sea, which Iraq lacked.

Operation
After borders were sealed and defense mounted by Mubarak Abdullah Al-Jaber Al-Sabah and his deputy Colonel Sheikh Saleh Mohammed Al-Sabah against the anticipated invasion, Brigadier General Sheikh Mubarak advised Kuwait's 11th Ruler and 1st Emir Sheikh Abdullah III Al-Salim Al-Sabah to invoke Section 4 of the independence agreement, which stated that Kuwait could ask Britain for military support, which was done on 30 June 1961.

The Royal Air Force sent 2 Canberra Reconnaissance aircraft, of 13 Squadron based in Cyprus, which flew daily sorties to photograph the border.

A troop of 42 Commando arrived by helicopter from Bulwark at the airport as a squadron of Hawker Hunters arrived. By 1 July Britain had half of a brigade group in Kuwait ready for action. The two Commando groups occupied high ground on and around Mitla Ridge, near the Iraqi border, in fierce summer heat. Brigadier Derek Horsford, Commander, 24th Infantry Brigade Group was rushed from Kenya to Kuwait to take command of the assembled British land forces.

In the following days, there were further reinforcements; an artillery battery of the 33rd Parachute Field Regiment, and the 11th Hussars with Ferret scout cars; 2nd Battalion, The Parachute Regiment arrived after a delay through difficulties over-flying Turkey. On 4 July, the 1st Battalion, Royal Inniskilling Fusiliers and the 34th Field Squadron arrived from Kenya. The Inniskillings and the 1st Battalion, The King's Regiment (Manchester and Liverpool) relieved 42 and 45 Commandos on 6 and 7 July. There more reinforcements from the UK.

The Kuwaiti combat contingent was led by Brigadier General Mubarak and Colonel Saleh Mohammed Al-Sabah who later commanded the Kuwait 25th Commando Brigade and the Kuwait 6th Mechanized Brigade.

Aftermath
The Arab League took over the protection of Kuwait and the British had withdrawn their forces by 19 October. Qasim was killed in a coup in 1963 but, although Iraq recognised Kuwaiti independence and the military threat was perceived to be reduced, Britain continued to monitor the situation and kept forces available to protect Kuwait until 1971. There had been no Iraqi military action against Kuwait at the time: this was attributed to the political and military situation within Iraq which continued to be unstable.

See also
 Gulf War
 Kuwait-Iraq 1973 Sanita border skirmish 
 Iraq–Kuwait border
  United Nations Iraq-Kuwait Observation Mission (April 1991- October 2003)

References

Military operations involving the United Kingdom
History of Kuwait
Iraq–United Kingdom military relations
1961 in Iraq
1961 in Kuwait
Kuwait–United Kingdom military relations
Iraq–Kuwait military relations
July 1961 events in Asia
1961 in military history